Niels Hjersing Clementin (1721-1776), was a Danish actor.  He was an elite actor of the Royal Danish Theatre in 1747-76 and belonged to the pioneer generation of the acting profession in Denmark and of the Royal stage. He was foremost known for his comical roles within the plays of Holberg and Molière, in which he became a role model.

References 

 Clementin, Niels i Nordisk familjebok (andra upplagan, 1906)

1721 births
1776 deaths
18th-century Danish male actors